The following highways are numbered 18B:

United States
 County Route 18B (Otsego County, New York)
 Nebraska Spur 18B
 New York State Route 18B (former)
 Oklahoma State Highway 18B